Li Ruofan (born April 30, 1978) is a Chinese chess player who holds the FIDE titles of International Master (IM) and Woman Grandmaster (WGM). Notable title victories include the 2001 Asian Women's Chess Championship in Chennai, and the 2006 Chinese Women's Chess Championship in Wuxi with a score of 8½/12.

Li played for the China national "B" team at the 1999 Women's Asian Team Chess Championship with an overall record of 3 games played (+0, =2, -1).

In 2002 Li won the Women's World University Chess Championship in Ulaanbaatar, Mongolia.
In 2007, she transferred national federations to represent Singapore. At the 2008 Japfa Chess Festival in Jakarta, Li Ruofan won the WGM Tournament, a six-player double round-robin event. Li played on board one for Singapore at the Women's Chess Olympiad at Baku in 2016, scoring +4 =4 -2 (60%).

In 2017 she moved back to the Chinese federation.

Personal life
Li lives in Shenzhen with her husband and coach, Grandmaster Zhang Zhong.

References

External links

Li Ruofan at Chessmetrics

1978 births
Living people
Chess International Masters
Chess woman grandmasters
Chinese female chess players
Singaporean chess players
Chess players from Jiangsu
Chess Olympiad competitors
Sportspeople from Suzhou